Juventud divino tesoro, is a Mexican telenovela produced by Televisa and originally transmitted by Telesistema Mexicano.

Cast 
Irma Lozano
Héctor Bonilla
Renata Flores (actriz)
Jorge Ortiz de Pinedo
Renata flores

References

External links 

Mexican telenovelas
Televisa telenovelas
Spanish-language telenovelas
1968 telenovelas
1968 Mexican television series debuts
1968 Mexican television series endings